Matt Saunders is a rugby union player for the Philippines national rugby union team. His rugby union position is at outside center and is the top try scorer in the Philippines. Saunders is a former professional rugby league footballer with Sydney Roosters and rugby union footballer for Kubota Spears.

Personal life
He was born in the United Kingdom to a British father and a Filipina mother who hails from Pangasinan. He has three other siblings Oliver Benjamin and sister Abigail.

Prior to his stint as a professional rugby league and rugby union footballer, he studied as an electrician in Australia and is qualified to practice the profession.

References 

Filipino rugby union players
Filipino rugby league players
Living people
Australian people of British descent
Australian people of Filipino descent
Sportspeople of Filipino descent
1988 births
Urayasu D-Rocks players
Kubota Spears Funabashi Tokyo Bay players
Rugby union players at the 2014 Asian Games
Philippines international rugby union players
Southeast Asian Games gold medalists for the Philippines
Southeast Asian Games medalists in rugby union
Competitors at the 2015 Southeast Asian Games
Asian Games competitors for the Philippines